Cantherhines fronticinctus, known commonly as the spectacled filefish, is a species of marine fish in the family Monacanthidae.

The spectacled filefish is widespread throughout the tropical waters of the Indo/ West Pacific area.

The spectacled filefish is a small sized fish that can reach a maximum size of 25 cm length.

References

External links
 

Monacanthidae
Fish described in 1867
Taxa named by Albert Günther